"Last One Standing" is a song by American singer Skylar Grey featuring American rappers Polo G, Mozzy, and Eminem. The song was made for the 2021 film Venom: Let There Be Carnage. The song was released on September 30, 2021, the day before the release of the film. It debuted at number 78 on the US Billboard Hot 100, making it Skylar Grey's first entry on the chart as a lead artist and Mozzy's first overall entry on the chart. The accompanying lyric video to the song is presented as a duet between Venom and his offspring Carnage, discussing their respective hosts.

In the single, there is also a remix of Eminem's song "Venom" from his album Kamikaze, which was the titular theme for the previous film.

Track listing
Formats and track listings of major single releases of "Last One Standing" are as follows:

Digital single (1 track version) from Itunes

Digital single (2 track version) from Itunes

Charts

Certifications

References

2021 singles
2021 songs
Songs written by Skylar Grey
Songs written by Eminem
Skylar Grey songs
Eminem songs
Songs written for films
Songs from Spider-Man films
Venom (film series)

Song recordings produced by DJ Frank E
Songs written by Polo G
Polo G songs
Songs written by DJ Frank E